The 2004 Espirito Santo Trophy took place 20–23 October at Rio Mar Country Club, on its River Course and Ocean Course, in Río Grande, Puerto Rico.

It was the 21st women's golf World Amateur Team Championship for the Espirito Santo Trophy.

The tournament was a 72-hole stroke play team event. There were 48 team entries, each with two or three players.

Each team played two rounds at the River Course and two rounds at the Ocean Course in different orders, but all the leading teams played the fourth round at the Ocean Course. The best two scores for each round counted towards the team total.

Team Sweden won the Trophy for their first title. The silver medal was shared between team Canada and team United States, who finished tied second, three strokes back. Defending champion team Australia finished 16th and was never in contention to retain the title.

The individual title was shared between Julieta Granada, Paraguay,  and Karin Sjödin, Sweden, whose score of 8-under-par, 280, was four strokes ahead of Jane Park, United States.

Teams 
48 teams entered the event and 47 teams completed the competition. Each team had three players, except the teams from  Egypt, Greece and Lithuania, which had only two players. One player representing Virgin Islands withdraw from the third and fourth round and one player representing Lithuania withdraw from the third and fourth round thereby withdrawing the team from the competition.

Results 

Source:

Individual leaders 
There was no official recognition for the lowest individual scores.

References

External links
Record Book on International Golf Federation website

Espirito Santo Trophy
Golf tournaments in Puerto Rico
Espirito Santo Trophy
Espirito Santo Trophy
Espirito Santo Trophy